Mercury NZ Limited is a New Zealand electricity generation and multi-product utility retailer of electricity, gas, broadband and mobile telephone services. All the company's electricity generation is renewable.

In August 2021, Mercury acquired five operating wind farms and several wind farm development options from Tilt Renewables. At the same time, the first power from the newly built wind farm at Turitea was generated – adding to the existing portfolio of nine hydro stations on the Waikato River and five geothermal plants located in the central North Island.

In the year ended June 2021, Mercury had generated 3,611GWh of electricity through hydro generation and 2,594GWh through geothermal generation.

In May 2022, Mercury acquired the retail business of Trustpower, including the retail customer base and Trustpower brand. The generation business of Trustpower changed its name to Manawa Energy Limited.

In June 2022, Mercury launched fibre broadband as a retail product to be bundled for its residential electricity customers.

Mercury's retail operations serve residential and small to medium business customers through its Mercury and Trustpower brands. It sells electricity, gas and broadband through Mercury and electricity, gas, LPG, broadband and mobile telephone services through Trustpower. Mercury has a pre-paid electricity product sub-brand GLOBUG.

Mercury also service industrial and wholesale market customers offering electricity and natural gas products.

Mercury has offices in Auckland, Tauranga, Hamilton, Rotorua, Taupō, Palmerston North, Wellington and Oamaru.

History

In the 1980s, the New Zealand Electricity Department (NZED) (a government department) controlled and operated almost all New Zealand electricity generation and operated the electricity transmission grid. The first phase of deregulation saw the New Zealand Government corporatisze the NZED and form the state-owned enterprise Electricity Corporation of New Zealand (ECNZ).

In 1994 Mercury NZ Limited was formed by the Auckland Energy Consumer Trust to own and operate the electricity supply business previously operated by the community-owned local authority, Auckland Electric Power Board (AEPB).

Also in 1994, Transpower New Zealand was separated from ECNZ and created as a State Owned Enterprise (SOE) to own and operate the national grid.

In 1996, ECNZ split into two SOEs, ECNZ and Contact Energy.

In 1998, law changes obligated AEPB to sell the electricity retailing and generation part of the business.

On 1 April 1999, ECNZ was split into three – Genesis Energy, Meridian Energy and Mighty River Power. Mercury's electricity retailing division was sold to Mighty River Power, who continued the trading name Mercury Energy. The electricity distribution business Mercury Energy Limited changed its name to Vector Limited and continued the distribution and transmission operation.

Mighty River Power took over the ownership and operation of the nine hydroelectric power stations on the Waikato River, New Zealand's longest river, and inherited assets of two largely decommissioned oil-fired power stations at Marsden Point, near Whangārei and its share in the Southdown Power Station (in conjunction with the Natural Gas Corporation).

In 2000, Mighty River Power acquired the Rotokawa geothermal power station, to operate and maintain the station, and own the geothermal turbines in a joint venture with the Tauhara North No.2 Trust. Also, that year, Mighty River Power commissioned the Mōkai geothermal power station geothermal power station in a joint venture with the Tuaropaki Trust.

In September 2002, Mighty River Power gained 100 percent ownership of the Southdown power station.

In 2004, Mighty River Power announced plans to refurbish the Marsden B plant to fire it on coal to increase supply security north of Auckland. Marsden B had been mothballed since it was completed in 1978 due to rising oil prices following the 1973 oil crisis and there being cheaper alternatives available. Greenpeace staged a nine-day occupation of the site in 2005, and after the Northland Regional Council granted consent, appealed to both the Environment Court and High Court, eventually overturning the consent. Mighty River Power appealed the High Court decision to the Court of Appeal, but in March 2007 dropped the proposal.

In 2008, Mighty River Power increased its generating capacity by opening the 100 MW Kawerau geothermal power station, increasing supply security to the eastern Bay of Plenty, a large timber processing area. In 2010, it opened the 140 MW Nga Awa Purua geothermal station near Taupō with the largest single-shaft geothermal turbine in the world. The commissioning of Nga Awa Purua increased Mighty River's geothermal capacity to 385 MW making it the nation's largest geothermal electricity generator with 52.7 percent of all installed geothermal capacity.

In 2009, Mighty River Power sold the Marsden B plant for $20 million to an Indian company, United Telecom. Resource consents for dismantling the plant were granted in June 2011, and the 20,000 tonnes of plant and equipment was dismantled later in 2011.

In Dec 2011, the National Government announced plans to reduce its shareholding in the four state-owned energy companies, Contact Energy, Genesis Energy, Meridian Energy and Mighty River Power (Mercury) from 100 percent to 51 percent and to sell off the remaining 49 percent as part of its controversial "mixed-ownership model" plan. Mighty River Power was to be the first company to be partially sold in September 2012, pursuant to legislative changes and market conditions. However, threatened legal action and unfavourable market conditions saw the Government delay any sale until March 2013 at the earliest.

On 5 March 2012, the Government began taking registrations of interest from the public in Mighty River Power shares. More than 35,000 people tried to register in the first six hours causing the registration website to crash for much of the day. By midnight, more than 90,000 people had registered.

In April 2013, State Owned Enterprises Minister Tony Ryall, in anticipation of the sale, said director fees would be increasing from $49,000 a year to $85,000, and the chair's fees from $98,000 to $150,000, despite still being majority-owned by taxpayers.

On 2 April 2013, The Financial Markets Authority approved the sale of Mighty River Power with the IPO (Initial Public Offering) on 15 April. However, the IPO was temporarily suspended on 22 April while a supplementary disclosure was issued, after the Labour and Green parties in opposition announced plans to reform the electricity market if elected to government at the 2014 election. At the close of the IPO on 5 May, there were 113,000 shareholders, and on 8 May the opening share price was set at $2.50, raising $1.7 billion. The Government was slightly disappointed, blaming the Labour-Green policy for putting off many more potential shareholders, with the Finance Minister indicating before the policy was announced that the price would be in the $2.70 to $2.80 range The government retained 51.78 percent of the shareholding, with another 1.02 percent owned by other Crown interests (mainly the New Zealand Superannuation Fund).

By September, shares had slumped to $2.16, well below the float price and in October the company announced it would be buying back up to $50 million in shares.

In December 2015, the gas fired Southdown Power Station, a 170 MW combined cycle power station in south Auckland was closed.

On 29 July 2016, after merging its retail and generation businesses the company changed its name to Mercury NZ Limited. The company also launched a new brand logo, moving from the Roman god Mercury, to a bee. Market research showed New Zealand had a stronger connection to the bee as a symbol.

In August 2021, Mercury acquired five operating wind farms and several wind farm development options. At the same time, the first power from the newly built wind farm at Turitea was generated.

In May 2022, Mercury acquired the retail business of Trustpower, including the retail customer base and Trustpower brand. The generation business of Trustpower changed its name to Manawa Energy Limited.

Power stations
Mercury operates 17 generation sites; 8 Hydroelectric Powerstations, 5 Geothermal, and 4 Wind Farms. 

In total, the company has 1884 MW of generating capacity – 1076 MW hydroelectric, 478 MW geothermal and 330 MW wind.

Generation developments

Subsidiaries
In addition to its generation assets, Mercury also incorporates or has major shareholdings in:
 GLOBUG, a pre-pay electricity retailer

See also
 Electricity sector in New Zealand
 List of power stations in New Zealand
 Starship Foundation, a charity supported by Mercury since 2001

References

External links
 

Government-owned companies of New Zealand
Electric power companies of New Zealand
Companies based in Auckland
Companies listed on the New Zealand Exchange
1999 establishments in New Zealand